Live from Patrick Street is the seventh album–recorded live–by the Irish folk band Patrick Street, released in 1999 on Green Linnet Records.

Recording
It was recorded in November 1998 while on tour in Britain and Ireland. It was produced by the band, engineered by Steve Rusby, Andy Seward and Ray Williams, and mixed by Ged Foley and Bernie Nau at Athens Music Lab in Athens, Ohio.

Seven of the twelve tracks were never recorded before by Patrick Street; the remaining five tracks were first recorded for the following studio albums:
Patrick Street (1986) – (track 11), 
No. 2 Patrick Street (1988) – (tracks 1 and 3), 
Irish Times (1990) – (track 10),  
Made in Cork (1997) – (track 5).

Track listing
 "McKenna's Jigs" (Traditional; arranged by Patrick Street) – 3:33 
 "The Raheen Medley" (Traditional; arranged by Patrick Street) – 4:32
 "Braes of Moneymore" (song) (words: Traditional; music: Patrick Street, new lyrics: Andy Irvine) – 4:00 
 "My Son In Amerikay" (song) (Traditional; arranged by Patrick Street) – 3:09 
 "Bring Back The Child"/"Páidín O'Rafferty" (double jigs) (Traditional; arranged by Patrick Street) – 3:43 
 "Wild Rover No More" (song) (Traditional; arranged by Patrick Street) – 5:08 
 "Unnamed Slide"/"Johnny O'Leary's Slide"/"Micho Russell's Slide" (Traditional; arranged by Patrick Street) – 3:38 
 "Jack The Bridge"/"Cul Aodh Polka"/"The Salmon Tailing Up The River" (Traditional; arranged by Patrick Street) – 3:37 
 "Stewball and the Monaghan Grey Mare" (song) (Traditional ; music & new lyrics: Andy Irvine) – 4:09 
 "Music For A Found Harmonium" (Simon Jeffes) – 3:52
 "The Holy Ground" (song) (Gerry O'Beirne) – 6:09
 "McDermott's Reel"/"The Plough And The Stars"/"Miss McLeod's Reel" (Traditional; arranged by Patrick Street) – 5:22

Personnel
 Andy Irvine - vocals, mandolin, bouzouki, harmonica, hurdy-gurdy
 Kevin Burke - fiddle
 Jackie Daly - accordion
 Ged Foley - guitar, fiddle

References

External links
Review of Live from Patrick Street at the Living Tradition website
Review of Live from Patrick Street at The Irish Echo website
Live from Patrick Street at Allmusic website
Live from Patrick Street at MusicBrainz website
Live from Patrick Street at Discogs website
Live from Patrick Street at Compass Records website
Live from Patrick Street in Reviews Index (fRoots magazine, Issue No. 191)
Live from Patrick Street in Reviews Index (Acoustic Guitar magazine, December 1999, Issue No. 84)
Patrick Street at Adastra website
Patrick Street at Herschel Freeman Agency website
Patrick Street at Celtic Cafe website

1999 live albums
Patrick Street albums